A by-election was held in the Legislative Assembly of Queensland seat of Archerfield on 19 May 1984. It was triggered by the death of sitting Labor member Kevin Hooper on 9 March 1984.

The seat was retained by the Labor Party with the election of candidate Henry Palaszczuk.

The only surprise in the result was the relatively strong showing of the Liberal Party compared to the National Party. Both the Labor and National parties had problems during the campaign, the former with factional feuding over candidate selection, and the Nationals with a candidate who seemed unsure whether his loyalties were to his own party or to Labor.

Results

See also
List of Queensland state by-elections

References

1984 elections in Australia
Queensland state by-elections
1980s in Queensland
March 1984 events in Australia